Nenana City School District (NCSD) is a school district in Nenana, Alaska.

It operates one public school, the Nenana City School (NCS), which has 179 students as of 2017–2018. Some students live in the Nenana Student Living Center, the district's boarding facility. The district also runs CyberLynx Correspondence Program.

Boarding house
The Nenana Student Living Center (NSLC) is a boarding home for high school students (grades 9–12) operated by the NCSD. As of 2018, it houses about 77 students who originate from various parts of Alaska. It is one of three in the state of Alaska. The students attend the regular Nenana City School and are not segregated in a separate education program. The center's students make up about 70% of the high school's enrollment.

References

External links
 
 CyberLynx Correspondence Program
 Profile from the Alaska Department of Education and Early Development

Education in Unorganized Borough, Alaska
Yukon–Koyukuk Census Area, Alaska
Buildings and structures in Yukon–Koyukuk Census Area, Alaska
School districts in Alaska
Public high schools in Alaska
Public boarding schools in the United States
Tanana Athabaskans